Old Hungarian is a Unicode block containing characters used for writing the Old Hungarian alphabet, an obsolete script which was used to write Hungarian during the medieval period.

History
The following Unicode-related documents record the purpose and process of defining specific characters in the Old Hungarian block:

References 

Unicode blocks
Rovas script